The Gulf Tower is a 44-story,  Art Deco skyscraper in downtown Pittsburgh, Pennsylvania. The tower is one of the major distinctive and recognizable features of the city and is named for the Gulf Oil Corporation, one of the leading multinational oil companies of its time, and one of the Seven Sisters of the Anglo-American oil industry prior to its merger with fellow oil giant Chevron.

Built as the headquarters for the Gulf Oil Company, the structure was designed by the firm of Trowbridge & Livingston and completed in 1932 at a cost of $10.05 million ($ million today). As late as 1981 Gulf Oil employed 3,100 within the building. The crown of the skyscraper is modeled after the Mausoleum of Halicarnassus in the style of a step pyramid. The building was listed as a Pittsburgh History & Landmarks Foundation Historic Landmark in 1973.

On June 13, 1974, a bomb was detonated on the 29th floor of the Gulf Tower.  The Weather Underground Organization took credit for the attack, claiming it was in protest to Gulf Oil's involvement in the oil rich regions affected by the Angolan War of Independence.

The building was condemned following a fire on May 19, 2021 and required repairs.  The Gulf Tower reopened to tenants and visitors six months later.

Lighting
Prior to the late 1970s, the entire multistory "step-pyramid/mausoleum" structure at the top of the building was neon-illuminated, changing colors to provide a weather forecast that could be seen for many miles.  This concept was developed by the building manager Edward H. Heath. He used the Gulf Oil colors to create a simplified forecast: steady blue meant colder and fair; flashing blue meant colder with precipitation; steady orange meant warmer and fair; flashing orange meant warmer with precipitation. Subsequently, in an effort to conserve energy, the weather forecasting role had been limited to the weather beacon at the pinnacle of the pyramid, which would glow blue for precipitation and red for fair weather. Although the terraced sides were once again illuminated at night (by means of spotlights), the entire pyramid structure no longer changed color with the weather (the pinnacle beacon still had that function).

Since 2001, the opening of PNC Park across the Allegheny River, fans have noticed that after Pittsburgh Pirates home-runs, the "beam" light flashes in celebration. Recently it was revealed that the afternoon and evening receptionist at the lobby desk was the one responsible for this fan favorite, following the games on her cabinet radio. The slogan "Flash the beam, Regina – that one's out of here!" has gained popularity among Pirates fans recently.

The KDKA Weather Beacon, the most recent weather beacon to adorn the pyramid atop the tower, was officially dedicated on July 4, 2012. In partnership with KDKA-TV, the Gulf Tower has been retrofit with a modern, automated LED weather beacon that will tell a more complete forecast than ever before. The Design concepts were created & implemented by the Design Team of Cindy Limauro and Christopher Popowich of C & C Lighting, LLC. A Pittsburgh based company. It will also feature holiday displays. Hearkening back to the original 1950's beacon, the entire pyramid will once again change colors at night depending on the current weather conditions. The new color-coded, tiered system works as such:

Floor By Floor Breakdown
 44th floor – temperature
 43rd floor – temperature
 42nd floor – temperature
 41st floor – precipitation
 40th floor – humidity
 39th floor – wind speed

See also
List of tallest buildings in Pittsburgh
List of tallest buildings in Pennsylvania

References

Further reading

1987 feature on Tower's history and transition from Gulf Oil
1989 news feature
1990 news feature

External links

Gulf Tower description on the City of Pittsburgh tour page

Skyscraper office buildings in Pittsburgh
Oil company headquarters in the United States
Office buildings completed in 1932
Pittsburgh History & Landmarks Foundation Historic Landmarks
Art Deco architecture in Pennsylvania
1932 establishments in Pennsylvania
Gulf Oil